Amy Lauren Fairchild is an American historian who is a professor of Public Health Ethics and Dean of the School of Public Health at the Ohio State University. She is co-director of the World Health Organization Collaborating Center for Bioethics.

Early life and education 
Fairchild was an undergraduate student at the University of Texas at Austin. She graduated in 1990, before moving to Columbia University to complete a master's degree in public health. She remained at Columbia for her graduate studies, where she investigates the health of migrants.

Research and career 
Fairchild works on public health ethics and policy. After completing her doctoral degree, she was appointed to the faculty of Columbia University. She studied the social forces that impact health inspection of migrants and disease surveillance and privacy. In particular, she was interested in the interplay between surveillance and public health policy. She was responsible for delivering the Department of Public Health history and policy course. She looked at the impacts of fear-based public health campaigns, such as Michael Bloomberg's efforts on tobacco use, obesity and HIV. She argued that banning e-cigarette sales and vaping would have negative impacts on people's health.

After twenty years at Columbia, Fairchild returned to Texas A&M University, where she served as Associate Dean and Vice President for Faculty Affairs. She joined Ohio State University as a professor in the College of Public Health in 2019. Throughout the COVID-19 pandemic, Fairchild was responsible for monitoring health on campus and providing public health advice to the people of Ohio. She called for a national mask mandate to prevent the spread of coronavirus disease.

Selected publications

Books

References 

Living people
Year of birth missing (living people)
Columbia University Mailman School of Public Health alumni
Texas A&M University faculty
University of Texas alumni
Ohio State University faculty
Bioethicists
American women historians
Historians from Texas
21st-century American women